Vehicle registrations of Burma started before 1996. 

The current plates contain a three letter regional code (such as YGN for Yangon) above a six character alphanumeric serial number.  As of 2015, new plates are now fully written in Latin characters, although older plates with all Burmese characters are still common, particularly on older vehicles. There are several types of license plates in Myanmar, colored and sized differently depending on vehicle and service as shown in the table below.

Vehicle types

Gallery of Myanmar vehicle registration plates

References 

 http://www.ministryofrailtransportation.com

Myanmar
Road transport in Myanmar

DD/5277